Ted Hope (born 1962) is an American independent film producer based in New York City. He is best known for co-founding the production/sales company Good Machine, where he produced the first films of such notable filmmakers as Ang Lee, Nicole Holofcener, Todd Field, Michel Gondry, Moisés Kaufman, and Shari Springer Berman and Robert Pulcini, among others. Hope later co-founded This is That with several associates from Good Machine. He later worked at the San Francisco Film Society and Amazon Studios.

Among Hope's twenty-three Sundance entries, are three Grand Jury Prize winners: American Splendor (2003), The Brothers McMullen (1995) and What Happened Was... (1994).  American Splendor also won the FIPRESCI Award at the 2003 Cannes Film Festival, the Critics prize at the 2003 Deauville Film Festival, and was nominated for five Spirit Awards and one Academy Award. Hope has also produced two Sundance Opening Night selections: Nicole Holofcener's Friends with Money (2006) and Moises Kaufman's The Laramie Project (2002), which was nominated for five Emmys.

In 2013, IndieWire named Hope to its inaugural list of Influencers, a list "dedicated to 40 of the people and companies who have captured our attention as we watch them try to figure out what the independent film industry is today and, more importantly, what it will become." The Hollywood Reporter cited Hope and his partners at This is That among the twenty-five most powerful people in the Independent Film business.

Early life

Hope transferred into the undergraduate film program at New York University.  He met his frequent collaborator and former business partner Anne Carey on his first day there.  After graduating, Hope worked as a production assistant for approximately three years, while also working as a script reader for numerous companies including New Line and MGM.

Hope advanced from work as a Production Assistant to Assistant Directing and Production Management. During that time he started to identify projects and filmmakers he wanted to work with.  Most notably Hope started working with Hal Hartley in the years prior to their first production.  Hope's first productions were Hartley's The Unbelievable Truth and Trust, on which he is credited as First Assistant Director and Line Producer, respectively.

Film career

The Good Machine years
In 1990, Hope and James Schamus founded Good Machine, an independent film production company based in New York.  They started doing line production for hire for various international auteurs, including Claire Denis, Dani Levy, and Jan Schutte.

At Good Machine, Hope and James Schamus produced Ang Lee's early films including Pushing Hands, The Wedding Banquet and Eat Drink Man Woman (both Academy Award nominees), The Ice Storm, and Ride with the Devil.

Hope produced Todd Solondz's Cannes Critics' Prize-winning Happiness, which Hope and his partners at Good Machine released themselves when its distributor dropped the film.  Hope also executive produced Todd Field's In the Bedroom, which earned five Academy Award nominations for Best Picture, Best Actress, Best Actor, Best Supporting Actress, and Best Adapted Screenplay.

Hope and Schamus brought David Linde in as a partner to Good Machine, in order to start their foreign sales arm, Good Machine International. In 2000, the Museum of Modern Art honored Good Machine with a retrospective.

In 2001, the partners sold the company to Universal.  Schamus and Linde stayed on and merged the international sales company with USA Films to create Focus Features.

This is That
With fellow Good Machine producers Anne Carey and Anthony Bregman, and Head of Business Affairs Diana Victor, Hope co-founded New York production company This is That in 2002. This is That specialized in unique content and innovative storytelling. This is That has produced seventeen films in the six years since its inception.

This is That's first release, 21 Grams, received two Academy Award nominations and five BAFTA nominations. The company's second release, Eternal Sunshine of the Spotless Mind, won an Academy Award for Best Original Screenplay. Hope's production of Oscar-winner Alan Ball's feature film directorial debut Towelhead marked his 18th production of a first time feature film director. In 2010, the company released The American, which opened at No. 1 at the US box office on opening week, and completed Super, written and directed by James Gunn, which was the first film to sell that year at the Toronto International Film Festival.

The company closed its doors in September 2010 after financial struggles with maintaining the office space. Hope hinted that he and Carey could possibly produce together again in the future.

San Francisco Film Society directorship
On August 8, 2012, the San Francisco Film Society named Hope as executive director of SFFS effective September 1. Ted Hope began work at the San Francisco Film Society Mid September 2012. Upon taking the position, Hope stated that it was an offer he could not refuse: “to save Indie Film and build it better than it has been before.”  Moving away from project-specific producing, Hope has turned his focus on producing an infrastructure that will sustain and nurture diverse artists, discover and promote fresh talent, and advance the tools and practices that will benefit those that create and appreciate truly ambitious art and entertainment.

Hope announced he would resign as executive director at the end of 2013, citing the challenges of working with a staff of 26 and a board. He said he planned to remain in the San Francisco Bay Area and lead the Film Society's advisory board. In March 2014, Noah Cowen, former director of the Toronto International Film Festival, took over as executive director of the SFFS.

Amazon Studios
On January 8, 2014, Hope was named CEO of Fandor, a curated online service for independent and international films. 

He left Fandor at the beginning of 2015 to become the head of production for Amazon Original Movies, stating, "To help carry the torch into the feature film world for such an innovative company is a tremendous opportunity and responsibility. Amazon Original Movies will be synonymous with films that amaze, excite, and move our fans, wherever customers watch." After July 2018 he served as the Co-Head of Movies for the studio under Jennifer Salke.
 
Amazon has released 38 films since 2016, notably winning three Academy Awards in the studio's first year as a distributor for titles Manchester by the Sea and The Salesman.

In May 2020, Salke announced that Hope had stepped down from his role as Co-Head of Movies to go back to being an independent producer. Hope made a first-look deal with Amazon that began on June 2, 2020.

MPAA campaign 
Hope was instrumental in organizing the successful 2003 antitrust campaign against the MPAA and its ban on screeners, uniting a diverse constituency, strategizing the effort, and ultimately providing in court the oral testimony that helped sway the judgement.  Although the MPAA head, Jack Valenti, claimed The Screen Ban was about combating "piracy", it was recognized by the court as stifling competition, particularly that of independent filmmakers against Hollywood. Hope has claimed a double win in the court case, as it is also where he met his wife filmmaker Vanessa Hope.

Double Hope Films
Double Hope Films is a production company founded by independent film producer Ted Hope and his wife Vanessa Hope in 2010.  Double Hope's first film, Dark Horse premiered at the Venice Film Festival in 2011, and the company's sophomore effort, Starlet, premiered at the South by Southwest Film Festival in 2012.

Filmography
He was a producer in all films unless otherwise noted.

Film

Second unit director or assistant director

Production manager

Miscellaneous crew

As an actor

Television

Second unit director or assistant director

Further reading
Hope maintains a Twitter account and several blogs, including Bowl of Noses (a curated site for children age 6+), These Are Those Things, and Truly Free Film.  Consolidated on his website, HopeForFilm, they cover topics including fun things happening in New York City, trends in indie film, and tips for better filmmaking.  He also co-founded Hammer To Nail, a film review site focused on Truly Independent Film.
 HopeForFilm, collection of Ted Hope's blogs.
 Hammer To Nail, film reviews.

Hope has also published articles in several periodicals, and consults on independent film and media. He is cited in the following books:
 Rough Guide To American Independent Film by Jessica Winter
 Down & Dirty Pictures by Peter Biskind
 Wake up Screening: What to Do Once You've Made That Movie by John Anderson and Laura Kim
 Killer Life by Christine Vachon
 Reel Truth by Reed Martin

References

External links 
 
 

American film producers
Living people
1962 births
Cinema of the San Francisco Bay Area
American independent film production company founders